A heptagraph is a sequence of seven letters used to represent a single sound (phoneme), or a combination of sounds, that do not correspond to the individual values of the letters.

Heptagraphs are extremely rare. Most other fixed sequences of seven letters are composed of shorter multigraphs with a predictable result.

See also
Multigraph (orthography)
Digraph (orthography)
Pentagraph 
Hexagraph

References

7